David Folley, (born 1960 in Plymouth) is an English painter based in Plymouth, Devon, UK. His private studio is located in the north of the city and the public face is his gallery and studio "Discover Folley", situated in Plymouth's historic Barbican. His style of painting has been influenced by Paul Cézanne, Stanhope Forbes of the Newlyn School, Pablo Picasso, Francis Bacon, and Roger Somville, a Belgium contemporary painter. Folley's interests include "Political theory and the interactions between individual and society", colour deficiency and colour perception.

Education
 2005 onwards Middlesex University where he is reading for his MA in Aesthetic Theory, currently on sabbatical
 2005 Graduated from Exeter University with a BA in Theology, Philosophy and fine art

Works
Folley has painted subjects that range from seascapes, portraits, and most recently his life size equine painting of the famous British racehorse Frankel. He has also painted a near life size Arabian Horse called Saffron who is stabled at Combe Farm.

Folley's works include:
 2012 Frankel: The Frighteningly Phenomenal Frankel, 7DC009
 2012 Combe Farm Arabian: Saffron, 7DC00B
 2012 Frankel: The Phenomenal Frankel, 7DC008
 2012 Frankel: The Thunder of Hooves, 7DC003
 2008 	Morris One, depicting The Plymouth Morris Men dancing the 'Sun Up' upon Plymouth Hoe, on 1 May 2008
 2008	Jojo i, The 9 Cast Members
 2008	Jojo ii, Painter in Residence, Barbican Theatre, Plymouth
 1998 Schröder Professor Emeritus
 1997 Spirit of Diana, a tribute to Diana, Princess of Wales
 1997 "Mad bad and dangerous to eat" which depicts a blue cow and a smog engulfed rainforest, exhibited as a protest outside a McDonald's restaurant
 1997 "Blood Brothers" a tribute to Willy Russell, named after the musical which is about separated twins
 1997 McDonald's: Mad, Bad and Dangerous to Eat
 1996 Folley was commissioned by The Revd. Raymond Chudley to paint his first altar painting The Descent from the Cross, for The Jesus Chapel, St. Andrew's Church, Wickford, Essex. The Bishop of Bradwell the Rt Revd Dr Laurie Green, unveiled and blessed the work on 5 May 1996, at the 09.30 am Eucharist.
 1996 in April, Plymouth Gdynia Twinning Panel sponsored Folley to visit Gdynia (Poland), to research and create a painting to commemorate the 20th Twinning Anniversary between the two cities. He produce over ten works, two of which were selected by the committee for presentation to the City of Plymouth and the City of Gdynia. The two selected works were: Gdynia Port: Looking from Kamienna Gora to Plymouth and Skwer Plymouth to Gdynia.
 1996 Music of the Night III
 1996 Roy Hudd and 'Jolly' Jack Tripp
 1994 Sir Alex Cairncross exhibited at The Pastel society, The Mall Galleries, London
 1994 Professor Roger Paulin commissioned by Trinity College, Cambridge
 1994 Tom exhibited at The Royal Portrait Society, The Mall Galleries, London
 1994 Wendy Cope exhibited at The Loggia Gallery, London.

Artist in Residence
 2008 Barbican Theatre, Plymouth, for the production of a play about fellow Plymouth artist Robert Lenkiewicz
 2008 Painter-in-Residence for Plymouth Morris Men

Exhibitions

 1994 The Royal Society of Portrait Painters, London
 1995 Hannover Gallery, Liverpool
 1995	The Pastel Society, London
 1995	The Loggia Gallery, London
 1995	Plymouth Arts Centre
 1995	S.T.E.R.T.S. Open
 1996	Viewpoint Gallery, Plymouth Art College
 2000 Es-SCAPES, McNeill Masters Art Gallery, Radlett
 2005	Dublin International Art Fair
 2007	Edinburgh International Art Fair
 2008 Barbican Theatre, Plymouth
 2008 Joy of Paint, at Les Jardins de Bagatelle, Plymouth
 2008/9 The Wharf, Tavistock, Devon

Commissions
 2004 EndomolUK, London
 1996 Trinity College, Cambridge
 1998 Trinity College, Cambridge

Represented by
 Discover Folley
 McNeill Gallery

References

Bibliography
Alan George Thompson, David Folley: Portrait of a Painter, Zap Art Promotions Ltd, 2003, pp10 
Chris Burchell, The Tavistock Wharf Anthology, Creative & Expressive Arts in Education, 1998, p22, pp87 

1960 births
Living people
Artists from Plymouth, Devon
Alumni of the University of Exeter
Christian art about death
Postmodern artists
Artist authors
20th-century English painters
English male painters
21st-century English painters
20th-century English male artists
21st-century English male artists